San Marino Basketball Federation is the governing body of basketball in San Marino. It was founded in 1968. It organizes the internal league and runs the San Marino national basketball team.

The current president of the federation is Gian Primo Giardi.

See also
 San Marino national basketball team

External links
San Marino Basketball Federation

Bask
Basketball governing bodies in Europe
1968 establishments in San Marino
Sports organizations established in 1968
Basketball in San Marino